The sixth government of Francisco Franco was formed on 11 July 1962.

Franco's sixth cabinet was made up of members from the different factions or "families" within the National Movement: mainly the FET y de las JONS party—the only legal political party during the Francoist regime—the military, the Opus Dei and the National Catholic Association of Propagandists (ACNP), as well as a number of aligned-nonpartisan technocrats or figures from the civil service.

Council of Ministers
The Council of Ministers was structured into the offices for the prime minister, the deputy prime minister and 18 ministries, including two ministers without portfolio and the office of the minister undersecretary of the presidency.

Departmental structure
Francisco Franco's sixth government was organised into several superior and governing units, whose number, powers and hierarchical structure varied depending on the ministerial department.

Unit/body rank
() Undersecretary
() Director-general
() Military & intelligence agency

Notes

References

Bibliography

External links
Governments. Dictatorship of Franco (18.07.1936 / 20.11.1975). CCHS–CSIC (in Spanish).
Governments of Franco. Dictatorship Chronology (1939–1975). Fuenterrebollo Portal (in Spanish).
The governments of the Civil War and Franco's dictatorship (1936–1975). Lluís Belenes i Rodríguez History Page (in Spanish).
Biographies. Royal Academy of History (in Spanish).

1962 establishments in Spain
1965 disestablishments in Spain
Cabinets established in 1962
Cabinets disestablished in 1965
Council of Ministers (Spain)